Farah Siraj is a Jordanian vocalist named as Jordan's “Musical Ambassadress”, has a career that spans the United States, Europe and the Middle East. She has performed at the United Nations, Nobel Prize Hall, the World Economic Forum, the TV show Good Morning Live in the USA, MBC TV in the Middle East and the Antena de Oro Awards of Spain. Farah Siraj was interviewed by Linus Wyrsch on "The Jazz Hole".

Biography

Early life and education
Born and grew up in Amman, the capital city of Jordan, surrounded by Middle Eastern music. At the age of three she began studying classical piano and music theory. Her first solo performance was at the age of four when she performed at the Royal Cultural Center, Amman. She continued her musical journey and by the age of sixteen was known as one of Jordan’s youngest composers. Following her years in Jordan, Farah moved to Spain with her family. She started her musical education attending Trinity College of Music, London, where she obtained a diploma in Music Composition and then graduated from Berklee College of Music in Boston, where she was recognized for her lush Arabian vocals.

Musical career
During her years at Berklee, she performed as a solo artist at a number events including performances in Britain, the United Arab Emirates, Jordan, Spain, Greece and the USA. In 2011 Farah internationally released her first EP entitled NOMAD, with funding from His Majesty King Abdullah II of Jordan. In NOMAD, Farah performs her original compositions, fusing influences of middle eastern music, flamenco, jazz, bossa and pop, with lyrics in Arabic, Spanish and English. The recordings took place in the Middle East, Spain and the USA, including more than 30 musicians from five different continents. In 2012, after NOMAD, Farah presented her new work, entitled The Arabian Jazz Project, featuring original compositions and traditional middle eastern tunes set to a jazz context for which she was called as The Norah Jones of the Middle East.

Humanitarian Works
Farah uses her music to raise awareness of humanitarian causes. She has composed music for and performed at events to raise awareness for the Genocide in Darfur as well as the Democratic Republic of Congo, the turbulence of gun battles as well as the humanitarian impact of the blast of 2020 in Beirut, and military conflicts in Gaza.

Discography
Zariya - A R Rahman - Coke Studio at MTV
Dialogue (Mosaico) - The New York Flamenco Jazz Project
The Arabian Jazz Project – Farah Siraj
Nomad - Farah Siraj
Homenaje a Chocolate - Olé y Amen - Pitingo
Palladio - Xibus - Boston String Quartet
To the Sudanese Women
King of Hearts
Megadeth - Dystopia guest vocals on "The Threat Is Real" and "Poisonous Shadows"

References

External links

Official Website
Farah Siraj Interview by breakthruradio.com

Jordanian women singers
Living people
People from Amman
Year of birth missing (living people)